Jonathan October (born 21 September 1974) is a South African-born Finnish cricketer. He was a right-handed batsman and a right-arm medium-pace bowler. He was born in Mossel Bay.

October's career began in 2002 when he represented Finland at the ECC Representative Festival competition, against Slovenia. Thanks to October's batting in the 40-over match, putting on 45 runs, they won the match by nine wickets.

October played in the Notts Sport Affiliates Championship competition in 2005, and in 2006 played in the Second Division of the Shepherd Neame Kent Cricket League for Bromley Common. October picked up two first-class appearances and two List A appearances for South Western Districts in the SAA Three-Day Challenge competition of 2006–07.

October played one further season in the Kent Cricket League, boosting Bromley Common's middle-order offense, and making a half-century in his final game in the competition.

External links
Jonathan October at Cricket Archive

1974 births
Living people
People from Mossel Bay
Finnish cricketers
South Western Districts cricketers
South African cricketers
Cricketers from the Western Cape